Muddling Through in Madagascar is a book by Irish author Dervla Murphy. It was first published by John Murray in 1985.

References

External links
 

1985 non-fiction books
Books by Dervla Murphy
John Murray (publishing house) books
Road transport in Madagascar